Alibobo Rakhmatullaev (born 8 February 1991) is an Uzbek footballer who last played as midfielder for Olmaliq.

Career
He has played for a Bunyodkor team since 2008. From 2009 to 2011 he played for Bunyodkor-2. He started playing for Bunyodkor in 2012. In the 2012 AFC Champions League quarter-final second leg match against Adelaide United he scored Bunyodkor's third goal in overtime which qualified his team to advance to the semifinal of tournament.
In February 2015 he moved to FK Buxoro.

Honours
 Uzbek League (1): 2013
 Uzbek League runner-up (1): 2012
 Uzbek Cup (2): 2012, 2013
 Uzbekistan Supercup (1): 2013

References

External links
 
 Eurosport Profile
 

1991 births
Living people
Uzbekistani footballers
Association football midfielders
Uzbekistan international footballers
Uzbekistani expatriate sportspeople in Azerbaijan
Azerbaijan Premier League players
Expatriate footballers in Azerbaijan